Pharmaceutical Development and Technology is a peer reviewed pharmaceutical journal that is published by Taylor & Francis. It covers research on the design, development, manufacture, and evaluation of conventional and novel drug delivery systems, emphasizing practical solutions and applications to theoretical and research-based problems. The journal aims to publish significant, innovative and original research to advance the frontiers of pharmaceutical development and technology.

The editor-in-chief is Professor Raid Alany, Chair of Pharmaceutical Formulation and Drug Delivery (Kingston University); Honorary Professor of Pharmacy, The University of Auckland.

References

External links

Publications established in 1984
Pharmacology journals
Taylor & Francis academic journals
English-language journals

https://www.kingston.ac.uk/staff/profile/professor-raid-alany-141/
https://profiles.auckland.ac.nz/r-alany